Jón Örn Loðmfjörð (born December 25, 1983, Selfoss) is an Icelandic experimental poet. He is noted for computer-generated poetry, and particularly his 2010 mash-up of the Icelandic government report into the collapse of Iceland's banks in 2008, Gengismunur ('Arbitrage').

Works

 (with Eiríkur Örn Norðdahl) Brandarablandarar: https://web.archive.org/web/20110419131623/http://www.norddahl.org/brandarablandarar/
 (with Arngrímur Vídalín, under the pseudonym Celidonius) Síðasta ljóðabók Sjóns ([Reykjavík]: Nýhil, 2008);  (ób.); 9979989629
 (with Kristín Svava Tómasdóttir, under the pseudonym Dr. Usli) Usli: kennslubók, Smábókaflokkur Nýhils, 4 (Reykjavík: Nýhil, 2009);  (ób.); 9979989688
 Gengismunur: ljóð úr skýrslu rannsóknarnefndar alþingis (Reykjavík: Nýhil, 2010); http://lommi.is/gengismunur/

Translations into English

 'Five Poems', 3:AM Magazine (December 19, 2010), http://www.3ammagazine.com/3am/five-poems-jon-orn-lo%C3%B0mfor%C3%B0/

References

External links
 Author's website

Jón Örn Loðmfjörð
Jón Örn Loðmfjörð
Living people
20th-century Icelandic people
1983 births
21st-century Icelandic poets
21st-century male writers